The Gundel Prize (German: Gundel-Preis) was awarded annually by the Academy of Fine Arts in Vienna for the students who excelled in the 6 art classes (painting, sculpture, engraving and medal arts, landscape painting, architecture and engraving).

This court prize was donated to the academy in 1782 by the imperial court councillor Paul Anton von Gundel. Until 1783 the prize was paid in cash and from 1784 medals were awarded: For the first prize a gold and for the second a silver medal from his "Most High Imperial Royal Grace".

The jury was formed by the academic college of professors.

Award winners (selection)

References 

International art awards
Arts awards in Austria
Academy of Fine Arts Vienna
Academy of Fine Arts Vienna alumni